Farthing or farthings may refer to:

Coinage 
Farthing (British coin), an old British coin valued one quarter of a penny
 Half farthing (British coin)
 Third farthing (British coin)
 Quarter farthing (British coin)
Farthing (English coin), the predecessor to the British farthing, prior to the union of England and Scotland
 English Three Farthing coin
Farthing (Irish coin), its counterpart among the pre-decimal Irish coins
Farthing, used in the King James Version and Douay–Rheims translations of the Bible to translate κοδράντης (kodrantes, quadrans) and ἀσσάριον (assarion, as), both Roman coins

Arts, entertainment, and media
Farthing (magazine), a defunct British science fiction magazine
Farthing (novel), a 2006 novel written by Jo Walton
 Farthings (Middle-earth), the four quarter divisions of the Shire
 Timothy Farthing, a fictional character from Dad's Army

People 
 Alan Farthing (born 1963), British obstetrician and Surgeon-Gynaecologist to the Royal Household
 Charles Farthing (1953–2014), New Zealand AIDS doctor
 Dan Farthing (born 1969), Canadian wide receiver player of Canadian football in the CFL 
 Hugh Farthing (1892–1968), Canadian politician
 Jack Farthing (born 1985), English actor
 John Farthing (1897–1954), Canadian philosopher
 John Farthing (bishop) (1861–1947), Canadian priest and Anglican Bishop of Montreal
 Matt Farthing, British musician and sole member of Stay+
 Michael Farthing (born 1948), British medical researcher
 Paul Farthing (1887–1976), American jurist
 Robert Farthing (fl. 1394–1397), English politician
 Stephen Farthing (born 1950), British painter
 Walter Farthing (1887–1954), British politician

Places
Farthing, Wyoming (also known as Iron Mountain), a railroad station and post office in Wyoming
Farthing Common, a common in East Kent, UK
Farthing Downs, a down in Croydon, London, UK
Farthings of Iceland, historical administrative divisions of Iceland
Farthings Wood, a woodland in Buckinghamshire, UK
Farthing Horn, subsidiary ridge of Denali to the north of the main peak

See also
 
 
 Penny farthing (disambiguation)

English-language surnames